Setosphaeria is a genus of fungi in the family Pleosporaceae.

References

Dothideomycetes genera
Pleosporaceae